{{Infobox election
| country = Norway
| type = parliamentary
| previous_election = 1993 Norwegian parliamentary election
| previous_year = 1993
| next_election = 2001 Norwegian parliamentary election
| next_year = 2001
| seats_for_election = All 165 seats in the Storting
| majority_seats = 83
| election_date = 15 September 1997
| image_size = 130x130px
| image1 = Thorbjørn Jagland (30366602783) (cropped).jpg
| party1 = Labour Party (Norway)
| last_election1 = 36.91%, 67 seats
| seats1 = 65
| seat_change1 = 2
| popular_vote1 = 904,362
| percentage1 = 35.00%
| swing1 = 1.91pp
| image2 = Carl i Hagen043 2E jpg DF0000062790.jpg
| party2 = Progress Party (Norway)
| last_election2 = 6.28%, 10 seats
| seats2 = 25
| seat_change2 = 15
| popular_vote2 = 395,376
| percentage2 = 15.30%
| swing2 = 9.02pp
| image3 = Kjell Magne Bondevik, Norges statsminister, under presskonferens vid Nordiska radets session i Stockholm.jpg
| party3 = Christian Democratic Party (Norway)
| last_election3 = 7.88%, 13 seats
| seats3 = 25
| seat_change3 = 12
| popular_vote3 = 353,082
| percentage3 = 13.66%
| swing3 = 5.78pp
| image4 = J Petersen.jpg
| leader4 = Jan Petersen
| party4 = Conservative Party (Norway)
| last_election4 = 17.04%, 28 seats
| seats4 = 23
| seat_change4 = 5
| popular_vote4 = 370,441
| percentage4 = 14.34%
| swing4 = 2.69pp
| image5 = Anne Enger crop splm13.jpg
| leader5 = 
| party5 = Centre Party (Norway)
| last_election5 = 16.74%, 32 seats
| seats5 = 11
| seat_change5 = 21
| popular_vote5 = 204,824
| percentage5 = 7.93%
| swing5 = 8.81pp
| image6 = Kristin_Halvorsen_Sentralbanksjefens_årstale_2018_(191746).jpg
| leader6 = Kristin Halvorsen
| party6 = Socialist Left Party (Norway)
| last_election6 = 7.91%, 13 seats
| seats6 = 9
| seat_change6 = 4
| popular_vote6 = 155,307
| percentage6 = 6.01%
| swing6 = 1.90pp
| image7 = Lars Sponheim 1.jpg
| leader7 = Lars Sponheim
| party7 = Liberal Party (Norway)
| last_election7 = 3.61%, 1 seat
| seats7 = 6
| seat_change7 = 5
| popular_vote7 = 115,077
| percentage7 = 4.45%
| swing7 = 0.84pp
| leader8 = Steinar Bastesen
| party8 = Non-Partisan Deputies
| last_election8 = 0.03%, 0 seats
| seats8 = 1
| seat_change8 = 1
| popular_vote8 = 9,135
| percentage8 = 0.36%
| swing8 = 0.33pp
| title = Prime Minister
| posttitle = Prime Minister after election
| before_election = Thorbjørn Jagland
| before_party = Labour Party (Norway)
| after_election = Kjell Magne Bondevik
| after_party = Christian Democratic Party (Norway)
| candidate3 = Kjell Magne Bondevik
| candidate1 = Thorbjørn Jagland
| candidate2 = Carl I. Hagen
}}Parliamentary elections''' were held in Norway on 14 and 15 September 1997. Prior to the election Prime Minister Thorbjørn Jagland of the Labour Party had issued the 36.9 ultimatum declaring that the government would step down unless it gained 36.9% of the vote, the percentage gained by the Labour Party in 1993 under Gro Harlem Brundtland. Whilst Labour won a plurality of seats, they were unable to reach Jagland's 36.9% threshold, gaining 35% of the vote.

As a result of this, the Labour government stepped down, being replaced by a centrist coalition of the Christian People's Party, Liberal Party and the Centre Party, with Kjell Magne Bondevik being appointed Prime Minister, and confidence and supply support from the Conservative Party and the right-wing Progress Party.

Results

Seat distribution

References

General elections in Norway
1990s elections in Norway
Norway
Parliamentary
Norway